Mian Muhammad Shafiq Arain is a Pakistani politician who had been a member of the National Assembly of Pakistan from August 2018 till January 2023.

Early life and education
He was born on 18 November 1956 in Dunyapur Tehsil.

He graduated in 1977 from the Government Emerson College and holds a Bachelor of Arts degree.

Political career
He was elected to the Provincial Assembly of the Punjab from Constituency PP-207 (Lodhran-I) as a candidate of Pakistan Peoples Party (PPP) in 2008 Pakistani general election. He received 30,506 votes and defeated Muhammad Aamir Iqbal Shah.

He was elected to the National Assembly of Pakistan from Constituency NA-161 (Lodhran-II) as a candidate of Pakistan Tehreek-e-Insaf in 2018 Pakistani general election.

In November 2018, he was appointed as Federal Parliamentary Secretary for Communications.

References

External links

More reading
 List of members of the 15th National Assembly of Pakistan

Living people
Pakistani MNAs 2018–2023
Pakistan Tehreek-e-Insaf MNAs
Pakistan People's Party MPAs (Punjab)
Punjab MPAs 2008–2013
1956 births
Government Emerson College alumni